Cryptocatantops debilis  is a species of grasshoppers in the subfamily Catantopinae, a group of insects commonly called spur-throated grasshoppers. The type specimen was a female found in Omaruru, Namibia.

References

External links 

 
 Cryptocatantops debilis at orthoptera.speciesfile.org
 Cryptocatantops debilis at the Interim Register of marine and Nonmarine Genera

Acrididae
Insects described in 1901
Insects of Namibia
Taxa named by Hermann August Krauss